Rendezvous is the seventh album by American alternative rock band Luna. It is the first Luna album to feature vocals by guitarist Sean Eden, on songs "Broken Chair" and "Still at Home."

Background
"The Owl and the Pussycat' is a musical adaptation of the poem by Edward Lear. "Astronaut" is a reworked version of the song of the same name that appeared on Close Cover Before Striking. The album was recorded live to analog two-track, with minimal overdubbing done in post-production.

Track listing
All music by Luna; lyrics by Dean Wareham, except where noted.
 "Malibu Love Nest"  – 4:31
 "Cindy Tastes of Barbecue"  – 4:09
 "Speedbumps"  – 3:06
 "The Owl and the Pussycat" (Eden, Wareham)  – 3:49
 "Astronaut" (Lee Wall, Wareham)  – 4:06
 "Broken Chair" (Eden)  – 3:56
 "Star-Spangled Man" (Wall, Wareham)  – 5:13
 "Motel Bambi"  – 4:29
 "Still at Home" (Eden)  – 5:12
 "Buffalo Boots"  – 3:29
 "Rainbow Babe"  – 3:22

References

Luna (1990s American band) albums
2004 albums
Jetset Records albums